Hamptonville may refer to:
Hamptonville, California, former name of Friant, California
Hamptonville, North Carolina